This is a list of airlines currently operating in Dominican Republic.

See also
List of airlines
List of defunct airlines of the Dominican Republic

Airlines
Dominican Republic
Airlines
Dominican Republic